Muri ( Fula: Lamorde Muri 𞤤𞤢𞤥𞤮𞤪𞤣𞤫 𞤥𞤵𞥅𞤪𞤭) is a town and traditional emirate in Jalingo but covers Karim Lamido LGA ARDO KOLA Yoro, Taraba LGA and others, in northwestern Taraba State, eastern Nigeria, approximately between 9° and 11° 40′ E. and 7° 10′ and 9° 40′ N. The Benue River is nearby, and the portion on the southern bank of the river is watered by streams flowing from the Cameroon region to the Benue.  In 1991, the town was estimated to have a population of 56,570. The valley of the Benue has a climate generally unhealthy to Europeans but there are places in the northern part of the province, such as the Fula settlement of Wase on a southern spur of the Murchison hills, where the higher altitude gives an excellent climate.

Tula–Waja languages such as Dadiya and Bangwinji are spoken in the Muri Mountains.

History
In 1817, Muri was founded as a Fulbe jihad state.

From 1892 to 1893 it was a de facto French protectorate, under Governor Louis Mizon (b. 1853 – d. 1899).

In 1901 it became a 25,800 m². province of the British protectorate of Northern Nigeria, bordered S. by Southern Nigeria, SE. by German Cameroon, E. by the province of Yola, N. by Bauchi, W. by Nasarawa and Bassa with an estimated population of about 828,000. The district of Katsena-Allah extends south of the Benue considerably west of 9° E., the approximate limit of the remainder of the province. The province is rich in forest products, and the Niger Company maintained trading stations on the river. Cotton is grown, and spinning thread, weaving and dyeing afford occupation to many thousands. Muri province included the ancient Jukun empire together with various small Fula states and a number of pagan tribes, among whom the Munshi, who extended into the provinces of Nassarawa and Bassa, were among the most turbulent. The Munshi occupy about 4000 m². in the Katsena-Alah district. The pagan tribes in the north of the province were lawless cannibals who by constant outrages and murders of traders long rendered the mail trade route to Bauchi unsafe, and cut off the markets of the Benue valley and the Cameroon from the Hausa states. Only two routes, one via Wase and the other via Gatari, passed through this belt. In the south of the province a similar belt of hostile pagans closed the access to the Cameroon except by two routes, Takum and Beli. For Hausa traders to cross the Muri province was a work of such danger and expense that before the advent of British administration the attempt was seldom made.

Muri came nominally under British control in 1900. The principal effort of the administration has been to control and open the trade routes. In 1904 an expedition against the northern cannibals resulted in the capture of their principal fortresses and the settlement and opening to trade of a large district, the various routes to the Benue being rendered safe. In 1905 an expedition against the Munshi, rendered necessary by an unprovoked attack on the Niger Company's station at Abinsi, had a good effect in reducing the riverain portion of this tribe to submission. The absence of any central native authority delayed the process of bringing the province under administrative control. Its government was organized on the same system as the rest of Northern Nigeria, and under a British Resident. It was divided into three administrative divisions -east, central and west- with their respective headquarters at Lau, Amar and Ibi. Provincial and native courts of justice were established. The telegraph was carried to the town of Muri. Muri is one of the provinces in which the slave trade was most active, and its position between German territory and the Hausa states rendered it in the early days of the British administration a favorite route for the smuggling of slaves.

List of Emirs

References

External links
WorldStatesmen - Nigeria
The Emirs of Muri: A Brief History
 Britannica website about Muri Emirate

Sokoto Caliphate
French West Africa
Populated places in Taraba State
1817 establishments in Africa